Adult Contemporary is a chart published by Billboard ranking the top-performing songs in the United States in the adult contemporary music (AC) market.  In 1974, 35 songs topped the chart, then published under the title Easy Listening, based on playlists submitted by easy listening radio stations and sales reports submitted by stores.

The first number one of the year was "Time in a Bottle" by Jim Croce.  It was a posthumous chart-topper for the singer, who had died in an airplane crash in September of the previous year.  Croce achieved a second posthumous number one in April with "I'll Have to Say I Love You in a Song".  Chicago, Gordon Lightfoot, Anne Murray and Charlie Rich also achieved two number ones in 1974, as did The Three Degrees, who had one chart-topper in their own right and another as featured vocalists on the song "TSOP (The Sound of Philadelphia)" by MFSB.  John Denver and Helen Reddy each had three number ones during 1974, with Denver's total of seven weeks in the top spot being the highest by any act.  Country-rock singer Denver was at the peak of his career in 1974, selling millions of records and achieving number ones on the Hot 100, easy listening and country charts.

Many of 1974's Easy Listening number ones also topped Billboards all-genre singles chart, the Hot 100, reflecting the fact that at the time mellower styles were popular across a range of demographics and on pop music radio as well as the easy listening format.  Songs by Jim Croce, Barbra Streisand, The Love Unlimited Orchestra, Terry Jacks, MFSB featuring The Three Degrees, John Denver, Gordon Lightfoot, Olivia Newton-John and Helen Reddy all topped both listings.  The final number one of the year was "Mandy" by Barry Manilow, which would go on to top the Hot 100 in 1975 and prove to be the breakthrough song for an artist who would become one of the most successful acts in the AC field.

Chart history

See also
1974 in music
List of artists who reached number one on the U.S. Adult Contemporary chart

References

1974
1974 record charts